Thuse Perera Liyanaralalage Nimali Dinushani Perera (born 13 December 1990, known as Nimali Perera) is a Sri Lankan cricket umpire.

In October 2022, she umpired five WT20I matches in the Women's Asia Cup.

In January 2023, she was named as one of the female umpires named by the ICC to stand in matches in the 2023 ICC Women's T20 World Cup.

See also
 List of Twenty20 International cricket umpires

References

External links
 
 

1990 births
Living people
Sri Lankan cricket umpires
Women cricket umpires